Get Rhythm is the debut studio album by American country music artist Martin Delray. It was released in 1991 via Atlantic Records. The album includes the singles "Get Rhythm", "Lillie's White Lies", and "Who, What, Where, When, Why, How".

Critical reception
Alex Henderson of AllMusic rated the album four stars out of five, stating that it was "unpredictable" and "indicated that Delray was a singer to keep an eye on".

Track listing

Chart performance

References

1991 debut albums
Martin Delray albums
Atlantic Records albums